The Harvard Theological Review is a quarterly peer-reviewed academic journal established in 1908 and published by  Cambridge University Press on behalf of the Harvard Divinity School. It covers a wide spectrum of fields in theological and religious studies; its range is not limited to any one religious tradition or set of traditions. Giovanni Bazzana became the editor-in-chief in 2020, succeeding Jon D. Levenson and Kevin Madigan.

Controversy
In 2014, the Review devoted a significant portion of its spring issue to the so-called "Gospel of Jesus' Wife" papyrus fragment  introduced by Karen Leigh King, which was later found to be a forgery. Investigative journalist Ariel Shabar found that two out of three peer reviewers had thought that the Gospel was likely to be a forgery and that the sole favourable reviewer Roger S. Bagnall had a clear conflict of interest in that he had helped King draft the paper. Two other experts employed by the journal also had conflicts of interest. King disclaimed the authenticity of the fragment herself in 2016, but the Review has refused to retract its articles.

Abstracting and indexing 
The journal is abstracted and indexed in:

References

External links 
 

Harvard Divinity School
Harvard University academic journals
Religious studies journals
Quarterly journals
Cambridge University Press academic journals
English-language journals
Publications established in 1908
1908 establishments in Massachusetts